Vincent Paul Kenney (30 June 1892 – 8 August 1959) was an Australian rules footballer who played with Richmond in the Victorian Football League (VFL).

Notes

External links 

1892 births
1959 deaths
Australian rules footballers from Victoria (Australia)
Richmond Football Club players